John Kusku (born August 6, 1984) is an American goalball player. His visual impairment is caused by retinitis pigmentosa. Kusku represented the United States at the 2016 Summer Paralympics and won a silver medal.

Early life and education
Kusku was born with retinitis pigmentosa, diagnosed with a vision problem at six months old, and diagnosed with the condition at the age of four. He attended Warren Mott High School and went to Western Michigan University to study education, earning a master's degree in mathematics. He teaches high school math and physics.

Career
Kusku represented the United States at the Parapan American Games and won a silver medal in 2011, 2015 and 2019.

He represented the United States at the 2016 Summer Paralympics in goalball and won a silver medal. He will again represent the United States at the 2020 Summer Paralympics.

References

External links 
 
 

1984 births
Living people
Male goalball players
Paralympic goalball players of the United States
Paralympic silver medalists for the United States
Paralympic medalists in goalball
Goalball players at the 2016 Summer Paralympics
Medalists at the 2016 Summer Paralympics
Medalists at the 2011 Parapan American Games
Medalists at the 2015 Parapan American Games
Medalists at the 2019 Parapan American Games
Sportspeople from Warren, Michigan
Western Michigan University alumni
Goalball players at the 2020 Summer Paralympics